The Kattenstoet (lit. "Festival of the Cats") is a parade in Ypres, Belgium, devoted to the cat. It has been held regularly on the second Sunday of May since 1955. Most recently, the 45th edition took place on 13 May 2018, with the next scheduled for 12 May 2024. The parade commemorates an Ypres tradition from the Middle Ages in which cats were thrown from the belfry tower of the Cloth Hall to the town square below.

Background
There are various legends about how the throwing of cats originated. One possibility is that cats were connected to witchcraft, and the throwing of the cats symbolised the killing of evil spirits. The last recorded event of this kind was in 1817. Another story suggests that the cats were brought into the Cloth Hall (Lakenhallen) to control vermin. Before modern heating and storage methods, when it got cold the wool was stored in the upper floors of the Cloth Hall. At the start of the spring warm-up, after the wool had been sold, the cats were tossed out of the bell tower.

Modern festival

Symbolically reviving this practice for the parade festivities, a jester tosses plush children's-toy cats from the Cloth Hall belfry down to the crowd, which awaits with outstretched arms to catch one. The throwing of the cats from the belfry is followed by a mock witch burning. Participants in the festivities often dress as cats, witches, mice, or townspeople from ages past, and the festival also features brass bands and people riding on horseback. Around 2,000 people participated in the 2012 parade. The festival is a popular tourist event in Belgium and has helped strengthen the local tourist economy around Ypres. 8,000 people visited the event in 2000.

See also
Cat-burning

References

External links

 Official Kattenstoet festival Website - City of Ieper

Animal cruelty incidents
Cats in popular culture
Parades in Belgium
Tourist attractions in West Flanders
Ypres
Belgian folklore
Spring (season) events in Belgium
Triennial events
Cat folklore